Howard D. McKibben (born April 1, 1940) is a senior United States district judge of the United States District Court for the District of Nevada.

Education and career

Born on April 1, 1940, in Virginia, Illinois, McKibben received a Bachelor of Science degree from Bradley University in 1962, a Master of Public Administration from the University of Pittsburgh in 1964, and a Juris Doctor from the University of Michigan Law School in 1967. He was in private practice in Minden, Nevada from 1967 to 1971. He was a deputy district attorney of Douglas County, Nevada from 1969 to 1971. He was the district attorney of Douglas County, Nevada from 1971 to 1977. He was a judge of the Ninth Judicial District Court of the State of Nevada from 1977 to 1984.

Federal judicial service

McKibben was nominated by President Ronald Reagan on September 28, 1984, to the United States District Court for the District of Nevada, to a new seat created by 98 Stat. 333. He was confirmed by the United States Senate on October 4, 1984, and received his commission the same day. He served as Chief Judge from 1997 to 2002. He assumed senior status on April 1, 2005.

References

Sources
 

1940 births
Living people
Judges of the United States District Court for the District of Nevada
United States district court judges appointed by Ronald Reagan
20th-century American judges
Nevada state court judges
District attorneys in Nevada
Bradley University alumni
University of Pittsburgh alumni
University of Michigan Law School alumni
People from Virginia, Illinois
21st-century American judges